Roger Duarte de Oliveira (born 11 January 1995), known as Roger Duarte or simply Roger, is a Brazilian professional footballer who plays for Dhaka Mohammedan as a central defender.

Club career
Born in Belo Horizonte, Minas Gerais, Roger represented Atlético Mineiro, São Paulo and América Mineiro as a youth. In 2016, he was promoted to the main squad by manager Givanildo Oliveira.

Roger made his first team debut on 20 April 2016, starting in a 1–1 Copa do Brasil away draw against Red Bull Brasil. He made his Série A debut on 28 May, coming on as a second-half substitute for Hélder Maurílio in a 1–1 draw at Cruzeiro.

On 4 February 2019, Roger was loaned out to Botafogo-SP.

Personal life
Roger is physically likened to Brazil international defender David Luiz, mainly due to his hair and footballing position.

Honours
América Mineiro
Campeonato Mineiro: 2016

References

External links

Roger Duarte at ZeroZero

1995 births
Living people
Footballers from Belo Horizonte
Brazilian footballers
Association football defenders
Campeonato Brasileiro Série A players
América Futebol Clube (MG) players
Centro Sportivo Alagoano players
Botafogo Futebol Clube (SP) players
Campeonato Brasileiro Série B players
Campeonato Brasileiro Série D players
Mohammedan SC (Dhaka) players
Brazilian expatriate footballers
Expatriate footballers in Bangladesh
Brazilian expatriate sportspeople in Bangladesh